České Velenice (1938–1945: Gmünd III)) is a town in Jindřichův Hradec District in the South Bohemian Region of the Czech Republic. It has about 3,400 inhabitants. It lies on the border with Austria and is adjacent to the town of Gmünd, to which it once belonged.

Geography
It lies in the Třeboň Basin.

History
Until 1870, there were only small settlements of Česká Cejle, Josefsko and Dolní Velenice in the area constituting current České Velenice, and it was part of the Austrian town of Gmünd. In 1868 the main railway station and the factory for repairing rolling stock and locomotives were established. The development of this border area was decisively increased by the inauguration of the Emperor Franz Joseph Railway connecting Vienna to Prague in 1869. Due to the construction, housing estates were built and the population grew, especially of Czech nationality.

At the end of World War I, the Treaty of Saint-Germain-en-Laye (1919) awarded the territory to Czechoslovakia. On 31 July it was officially attached to Czechoslovakia and became the new municipality, at first under the names Cmunt v Čechách and Český Cmunt, and since 1922 under the name České Velenice. Until 1938, České Velenice was a prospering municipality with an important railway junction.

During World War II, České Velenice changed to a town with 95% of population being of German nationality. On 23 March 1945, the town and the railway workshops were severely damaged by American-English air strikes. This caused a mass exodus from the town of people who lost both their homes and their employment. After the war, the depopulated town was partially inhabited by the original residents.

Demographics

Economy
The largest employer based in the town is the company Magna Cartech, a branch of Magna International. It focuses on sheet metal pressing and welding for automotive industry.

Transport

The town shares the railway and pedestrian border crossing with Gmünd.

Today, the railway line has only regional significance, as the main line runs via Brno, along the first Czech railway corridor.

Notable people
Adolf Born (1930–2016), painter, cartoonist and illustrator

References

External links

Cities and towns in the Czech Republic
Populated places in Jindřichův Hradec District
Austria–Czech Republic border crossings
Divided cities